Kevin L. Finnegan (born June 1, 1964, in Newburyport, Massachusetts) an American politician and the current Clerk for the Peabody District Court in Peabody, Massachusetts. From 1997 to 2001 he represented the 1st Essex District in the Massachusetts House of Representatives. From 1994 to 1997 he was a member of the Newburyport City Council.

Early life and education 
Finnegan was born in Newburyport, Massachusetts on June 1, 1964. He graduated from the University of Massachusetts Lowell in 1996 and subsequently from the Massachusetts School of Law in 1999.

References

1964 births
University of Massachusetts Lowell alumni
Massachusetts School of Law alumni
Republican Party members of the Massachusetts House of Representatives
Politicians from Newburyport, Massachusetts
Living people